Christiane Rousseau (born March 30, 1954 in Versailles, France) is a French and Canadian mathematician, a professor in the department of mathematics and statistics at the Université de Montréal. She was president of the Canadian Mathematical Society from 2002 to 2004.

Education and career
Rousseau earned her Ph.D. from the Université de Montréal in 1977, under the supervision of Dana Schlomiuk. After postdoctoral research at McGill University, she joined the Montréal faculty in 1979, and was promoted to full professor in 1991.

Recognition
She has received the Adrien-Pouliot Prize and the Abel-Gauthier Prize of the Mathematical Association of Québec, and the 2009 Graham Wright Award for Distinguished Service from the Canadian Mathematical Society. She also received the 2014 George Pólya Award of the Mathematical Association of America for her article about a discovery by Inge Lehmann, "How Inge Lehmann Discovered the Inner Core of the Earth". In 2012, she became a fellow of the American Mathematical Society (AMS). In 2017 she became the inaugural recipient of the AMS' Bertrand Russell prize for furthering human values and the common good through mathematics.
In 2018 the Canadian Mathematical Society listed her in their inaugural class of fellows.

References

1954 births
Living people
French mathematicians
Canadian mathematicians
Academic staff of the Université de Montréal
People from Versailles
Fellows of the American Mathematical Society
Fellows of the Canadian Mathematical Society
French women mathematicians
Presidents of the Canadian Mathematical Society